This is a list of football clubs in Lesotho.
For a complete list see :Category:Football clubs in Lesotho

A
Arsenal (Maseru)

B
Bantu FC (Mafeteng)
Botha Bothe Roses
Butha-Buthe Warriors

J
Joy (Leribe)

L
Lerotholi Polytechnic (Maseru)
Lesotho Correctional Services (Maseru)
Lesotho Defence Force FC (Maseru)
Lesotho Mounted Police Service FC (Maseru)
Lioli FC (Teyateyaneng)
Limkokwing FC (Maseru)
Linare FC (Leribe)
Likhopo FC (Maseru)
Liphakoe (Quthing)

M
Majantja FC (Mohale's Hoek)
Manonyane FC (Roma)
Maseru Brothers FC (Maseru)
Matlama FC (Maseru)
Mazenod Swallows (Maseru)
Melele FC (Qacha'nek)
Mphatlalatsane FC (Maseru)

N
Nyenye Rovers (Maputsoe)

Q
Qoaling Highlanders FC (Maseru)

R
Roma Rovers (Maseru)

S
Sandawana FC (Makheka)

External links
 RSSSF

 
Football clubs
Lesotho
Football clubs